In computer graphics, clamping is the process of limiting a position to an area. Unlike wrapping, clamping merely moves the point to the nearest available value.

To put clamping into perspective, pseudocode (in Python) for clamping is as follows:
def clamp(x: int | float, minimum: int | float, maximum: int | float) -> int | float:
    """Limit a position to an area."""
    if x < minimum:
        x = minimum
    elif x > maximum:
        x = maximum
    return x

Uses
In general, clamping is used to restrict a value to a given range. For example, in OpenGL the glClearColor function takes four GLfloat values which are then 'clamped' to the range .

One of the many uses of clamping in computer graphics is the placing of a detail inside a polygon—for example, a bullet hole on a wall. It can also be used with wrapping to create a variety of effects.

References

Computer graphics algorithms
Articles with example pseudocode
Articles with example Python (programming language) code